Ashot Karagyan (born 23 January 1951) is a Soviet fencer. He won a silver medal in the team foil and a bronze in the team épée events at the 1980 Summer Olympics.

References

1951 births
Living people
Soviet male fencers
Olympic fencers of the Soviet Union
Fencers at the 1980 Summer Olympics
Olympic silver medalists for the Soviet Union
Olympic bronze medalists for the Soviet Union
Olympic medalists in fencing
Sportspeople from Yerevan
Medalists at the 1980 Summer Olympics